Pyarjung  is a village development committee in Lamjung District in the Gandaki Zone of northern-central Nepal. At the time of the 1991 Nepal census it had a population of 2256 people living in 443 individual households.

2015 Nepal earthquake
The village was affected by the earthquake on 25 April 2015. It along with Bichaur, Ilampokhari, Dudhpokhari, Gaudu, and Kolki were the most affected villages in Lamjung district.

References

External links
UN map of the municipalities of Lamjung District

Populated places in Lamjung District